This is a list of radio stations broadcast in Romania.

Radio stations

Public
 Radio România Actualități
 Radio România Cultural
 Radio România Muzical
 Radio Romania International
 RRI 1
 RRI 2
 Radio 3Net - "Florian Pittiş"
 Radio Antena Satelor
 Radio România Regional
 Radio Antena Brașovului
 Radio București
 Radio Cluj
 Radio Constanța
 Radio Craiova
 Radio Iași
 Radio Mureș
 Radio Reșița
 Radio Sighet
 Radio Timișoara
 Radio Vacanța

Private
 BBC Romania - closed
 Pro FM Campus
 Metronom FM Romania
 Social FM
 City FM
 Civic FM
 RFI România
 Deutsche Welle
 Digi FM
 Europa FM
 Info Pro
 Jazz FM Romania
 Kiss FM
 Magic FM
 Radio Micul Samaritean
 Mix FM
 National FM
 News FM
 OneFM
 Pro FM
 Pro FM Dance
 Virgin Radio Romania (former Radio 21)
 Radio 21 Dance
 Radio Deea
 Radio Guerrilla
 Radio Total
 Radio Trinitas
theRebel România
 Romantic FM
 Student FM
 Soft FM
 Total Sport FM
 Vibe FM
 Vocea Evangheliei
 Vocea Sperantei
 Radio Vox T
 Radio ZU
 FREY24 Romania

Local
 EBS Radio (Cluj-Napoca),(Dej)
* Metronom FM (Râmnicu Vâlcea)
 Stil FM (Călăraşi and Oltenița)
 Orizont FM Medgidia (Medigidia)
 Radio Voces Campi (Călăraşi and Olteniţa)
 Radio Bărăgan (Călăraşi)
 Radio Campus (Buzău, Urziceni, Slobozia)
 Radio Orion (Feteşti)
 Radio 1 (Galaţi)
 Radio Prahova (Prahova county)
 Radio Romanaia Dance ([in Winamp in shoutcasta radio])
 Radio Constanța (Constanța)
 Radio Holiday (Constanța)
 Sky FM (Constanța)
 Social FM (Transylvania)
 West City Radio (Timişoara)
 Radio Stil / Stil FM (Dej)
 Doina FM (Neptun)
 Radio Star FM (Sebes-Alba)
 Radio X-ON (ORION) (Sebes-Alba)

Radio stations
Mass media in Romania
Romania